Rock'n Coke was the biggest open Turkish rock festival sponsored by Coca-Cola. It was traditionally held at the Hezarfen Airfield in Istanbul, Turkey. Famous headliners like Limp Bizkit, Motörhead, Travis, Moby, Nine Inch Nails, Muse, Franz Ferdinand, Placebo, The Cure, Korn, Arctic Monkeys, Iggy Pop, Gogol Bordello, The Prodigy, Linkin Park, Within Temptation, The Rasmus, Juliette Lewis performed at the festival over the years.

Festival 
Rock'n Coke is a member of the European Festivals Association. The festival was organized by the Turkish concert organizer Pozitif. At the end of every summer, the Hezarfen Airfield was used as a venue for a two-day chain of concerts, with both national and international performers featured. Although mainly rock-oriented, Rock'n Coke also hosts other music genres. While the main stage was generally reserved for rock and its subgenres, the DJ Arena (now called Burn Stage, following the sponsorship) was reserved for styles such as house music.

In 2005, the festival grounds were large enough to support two stages, a mini-amusement park, two large food areas, a shopping area, several sponsor attractions, 400 outhouses and a large camp site for people with two-day tickets. In 2008 & 2010, no festival was held due to decision of making it every two years. 2011's festival was held on 16–17 July at the airfield again. The 2013 festival was held later than of 2011 on 6–8 September again at the Hezarfen Airfield.

Kanal D and Dream TV were the major media sponsors of the organization.

Rock'n Coke 2013 

Main Stage'
Saturday 7 September 2013
 Büyük Ev Ablukada
 maNga
 Editors
 Duman
 Hurts
 Arctic Monkeys

Sunday 8 September 2013
 The Prodigy
 Rebel Moves
 Aylin Aslım
 Primal Scream
 Within Temptation
 Teoman
 Jamiroquai

Alternative Stage
Saturday 7 September 2013
 The Ringo Jets
 Ayyuka
 Triggerfinger
 Palma Violets
 Maxïmo Park
 Can Bonomo
 La Roux

Sunday 8 September 2013
 Ellie Goulding
 Skindred
 Replikas
 Oi Va Voi
 Yasemin Mori
 Melis Danişmend
 Selah Sue

"Discovery" Stage
Saturday 7 September 2013
 Çağrı Sertel Trio
 Figli Di Madre Ignota
 Yemen Blues
 Yora
 Parno Graszt
 Deladap
 Kirika
 Boban Markovich Band

Sunday 8 September 2013
 Deniz Güngör Aquadrum
 Serdar Barçın Band
 Umut Adan
 Radio Moscow
 Farfara
 Che Sudoka
 Kadebostany
 Mabel Matiz
 Shantel's Bucovina Club Band

Past performances

Rock'n Coke 2011 

 Main Stage

Saturday 16 July 2011
Limp Bizkit
Motörhead
2 Many DJs
The Kooks
Kurban

Sunday 17 July 2011
Travis
Moby
Paolo Nutini
Skunk Anansie
Athena
Friendly Fires

 Alternative Stage
Curry&Coco
Ilhan Ersahin's Istanbul Sessions
Acid Washed
Thievery Corporation
Beach House
Gaslamp Killer
Tunng
FM Belfast
Melis Danişmend

 Sonar Stage
Dum Dum Girls
Electrelane
Esben and the Witch
Mogwai
The Black Lips
The Qemists
Chapel Club

Rock'n Coke 2009 

Rockn Coke 2009 was held 17,18 and 19 July 2009 at its new venue Istanbul Park.

Main stage 
First Day 18.
 The Prodigy
 Nine Inch Nails
 Duman
 Jane's Addiction
 Juliette Lewis
 Emre Aydın
 Upgrade
Second Day 19.
 Linkin Park
 Kaiser Chiefs
 Razorlight
 Hayko Cepkin
 Manga vs. Cartel
 Cold War Kids
 D2
 Türbülans

Alternate Stages 
First Day 18.
 Gece
 WUFI
 Gren
 Çilekeş
 The Twelves
 FOMA
 Sakin
 Badem
Second Day 19.
 Sattas
 ProudPilot
 Fuat
 We have Band
 Post Dial
 Mabbas & Style-ist
 Santigold
 Çilekeş

Rock'n Coke 2007 

Main Stage
Franz Ferdinand
The Smashing Pumpkins
Manic Street Preachers
Chris Cornell
Teoman
Rashit
Pentagram
Within Temptation
Özlem Tekin
Badly Drawn Boy
Hayko Cepkin
Gripin
Aslı
110

Burn Stage
Erol Alkan
DJ Mehdi
Uffie & Feadz
Filthy Dukes
Buraka Som Sistema
Agentorange
Bedük
Style-ist
Mabbas
Kreş
Ayben
Fairuz Derinbulut
Ayyuka
Rumblefish
Neon
Digital Playground
Üçnoktabir
Engin Eraydın

Rock'n Coke 2006 

Main Stage
Muse
Placebo
Kasabian
Gogol Bordello
Şebnem Ferah
Mercury Rev
Hayko Cepkin
The Sisters of Mercy
Duman
Editors
Reamonn
Vega
Ogün Sanlısoy
Yüksek Sadakat

Burn Stage
Danny Howells
Demi
Tangun
The Glimmers
Mabba & Syle-İST
Portecho
West End Girls
Dandadadan
Aydilge
Tiga
Hyper
Headman
Ali & Ozan
The Rogers Sisters
Direc-t
Dorian

Rock'n Coke 2005 

Main Stage
The Cure
Korn
The Offspring
Apocalyptica
Skin
Şebnem Ferah
The Tears
Hot Hot Heat
Ceza
Nação Zumbi
Pamela Spence
Replikas
MaNga
Rashit & Hanin Elias

Burn Stage
Timo Maas
Tamburada
Karargah
Murat Beşer
Angie Reed
Style-ist
Evil Nine
Eden & Batu
Jonny Rock
Tom Middleton
Emre & Tutan
Ricardo Villalobos
Barış K
The Rootsman
110
Sid Le Rock Reynold
Mabbas
The Bays
Murat Uncuoğlu & Shovell
Alex Smoke
Ellen Allien
Mylo

Rock'n Coke 2004

Main Stage
Iggy & The Stooges
The Rasmus
50 Cent
MFÖ
Ash
Sly & Robbie & Taxi gang
Fun Lovin' Criminals
The Orb
dEUS
Spiritualized
Athena
Wax Poetic
Kurban
Özlem Tekin
3 Colours Red
Erkin Koray
Kargo
Rebel Moves

DJ Arena
Carl Craig
Richard Fearless
The Jugula Sessions hosted by Neneh Cherry (DJ Set) & The Family
Zion Train (Live)
DJs Are Not Rockstars Princess Superstar & Alexander Technique on 4 Decks
Kris Verex
Orient Expressions (Live)
P.O.P (Live)
Barış K
DJ Krush (Live)
Etienne de Crécy
Jo Jo De Freq
Psychonauts
Twilight Circus Dub Sound System
Asher Selector
Hakan Kurşun (Live)
Agent Orange
İsmet

Rock'n Coke 2003 

Main Stage
Pet Shop Boys
The Cardigans
Suede
Simple Minds
Echo & the Bunnymen
Hooverphonic
MFÖ
Athena
Dreadzone
Guano Apes
Sugababes
Duman
Mercan Dede feat. Athena
Nil Karaibrahimgil
Rashit
Dirty Vegas
Dead Kennedys
The Delgados

DJ Arena
Phil Hartnoll
DJ Paul Daley
Lisa Pin-Up
Arkın Allen (Mercan Dede)
Fuchs
Daddy G
Felix Da Housecat
Marshall Jefferson
Slam
Mabbas
DJ Yakuza
Style-ist

See also 
 RockIstanbul

References

External links 
Official site 
Organizer's official site 
YOUROPE's official site

Rock festivals in Turkey
Festivals in Istanbul
Coca-Cola
2003 establishments in Turkey
Annual events in Turkey
Electronic music festivals in Turkey
Music festivals established in 2003